The All Blended Party is a political party in Nigeria, The party was announced by the Independent National Electoral Commission (INEC) as a full-fledged political party on December 14, 2017. Archbishop Samson Mustapha Benjamin was the visional founder and Moses Shipi is the national chairman of the party.

References

External links
All Blended Party website

2017 establishments in Nigeria
Political parties established in 2017
Political parties in Nigeria